Vladimir Krstić (Serbian Cyrillic: Владимир Крстић; born 28 June 1987) is a retired Serbian footballer.

Career statistics

Honours
Napredak Kruševac
Serbian First League: 2015–16

References
Krstić: Mislio sam da su golovi u Bečeju povratna karta za "Marakanu"
Vladimir Krstić at srbijafudbal

1987 births
Living people
Sportspeople from Valjevo
Serbian footballers
Association football defenders
OFK Bečej 1918 players
FK Kolubara players
FK Voždovac players
FK BSK Borča players
FK Sloboda Užice players
FK Borac Čačak players
FK Sloga Petrovac na Mlavi players
FK Napredak Kruševac players
FK Budućnost Valjevo players
FK Jedinstvo Ub players
Serbian First League players
Serbian SuperLiga players